The AFC U-20 Women's Asian Cup is an association football tournament for women's national teams under the age of 20, organized by the Asian Football Confederation (AFC). It is organised by the Asian Football Confederation every two years, and serves as a qualifying competition for the FIFA U-20 Women's World Cup. It was first played in 2002 as the AFC U-19 Women's Championship with an upper age limit of 19. Starting from the 2022 edition, the age limit was raised to 20. Moreover, the tournament will also be rebranded from the "AFC U-19 Women's Championship" to the "AFC U-20 Women's Asian Cup".

The current champion is Japan, which won the 2019 final 2–1 against North Korea. Japan is also the most successful team in the tournament, having won six times.

Format
In 2002 and 2004 no qualifying round was played, with all teams directly participating in the group stage. Qualifying rounds were introduced starting from the 2006 edition, with eight teams qualifying to the final tournament. The eight teams were divided into two groups of four, with the top two teams qualifying to the semi-finals. In 2011 and 2013 the teams were reduced to six, which all played a single round-robin tournament. From 2015 onwards, the pre-2011 format was recovered.

History

Results

Performance by country

Medal summary

Awards

Summary (2002-2019)

Comprehensive team results
Legend
 – Champions
 – Runners-up
 – Third place
 – Fourth place
QF – Quarterfinals
GS – Group stage
 – Did not qualify 
 – Did not enter / Withdrew
 – Country did not exist or national team was inactive
 – Hosts
q – Qualified for upcoming tournament

For each tournament, the flag of the host country and the number of teams in each finals tournament (in brackets) are shown.

References

External links

 at RSSSF.com

 
Under-19 association football competitions
Asian Football Confederation competitions for women's national teams
Recurring sporting events established in 2002